WebRunner  or Webrunner may refer to:
 a historical name for HotJava web browser
 Netrunner, a game
 Mozilla Prism, a discontinued XULRunner site-specific browser, now being maintained under its former name of WebRunner